HD 167042 is a 6th magnitude K-type subgiant star located approximately 164 light-years away in Draco constellation. It has mass of 1.88 times that of the Sun and the age is only 1.8 billion years old. When this star was a main sequence, it was white mid to late A-type star based on its mass.

Planetary system 
On 28 November 2007, a preprint of the discovery of the planet HD 167042 b was posted to the arXiv server. The peer reviewed paper was then published in The Astrophysical Journal on 1 March 2008. The discovery was later independently confirmed.

See also 
 HD 16175
 Kappa Coronae Borealis
 List of extrasolar planets

References

External links 
 

Draco (constellation)
167042
089017
K-type subgiants
Planetary systems with one confirmed planet
Durchmusterung objects
6817